A cucumber is an edible vegetable.

Cucumber may also refer to:

Arts and entertainment
 Cucumber (British TV series), a 2015 British television series
 Cucumber (card game), a north European card game of Swedish origin
 Cucumber (Canadian TV series), a Canadian children's television series originally broadcast in the 1970s
 The Cucumbers, a 1980s power pop/new wave band from New Jersey

Plants
 Armenian cucumber, an edible vegetable closely related to the common cucumber
 Cucumber tree, several unrelated trees
 Wild cucumber (disambiguation), several species of plants similar to cucumbers

Other
 Cucumber (software), a behavior-driven development tool
 Cucumber, West Virginia, a community in West Virginia
 Cucumber beetle, a type of beetle
 Sea cucumber (Holothuroidea), a type of animal
 "Cucumber King" (Nyaung-u Sawrahan), a ruler of the kingdom of Pagan in what is now Burma
 The top level on the 1 to 4 EHS scale developed by the European Association of Urology

See also 
 
 Cuke (disambiguation)